A discontinued post office or DPO is an American postal term for a post office which  is no longer in service or is in service under another name. Some are in ghost towns, some victims of consolidation of mail service as small post offices are closed or a city expands. The introduction of Rural Free Delivery, RFD, in 1902 led to the closure of many post offices, which peaked in 1901 at 76,945. In the United States, which was mostly rural, mail previously had been picked up in rural areas at small local post offices, home delivery being limited to urban areas until experimentation with rural delivery began in 1890.

Covers, that is letters, wrappers, or postmarks from discontinued post officers are of interest to students of postal history. As one example, in Saguache County, Colorado there are over 50 discontinued post offices.

Notes

Further reading
Examples of references from the postal history of Colorado:
Bauer, William H.; Ozment, James L.; and Willard, John H., Colorado Post Offices, 1859-1989: A Comprehensive Listing of Post Offices, Stations, and Branches, Colorado Railroad Museum (May 1990), hardcover, 280 pages, 
Helbock, Richard W., A Checklist of Colorado Post Offices 1858-1988
Jarrett, David L., Colorado Territorial and Pre-Territorial Postmarks, Collector Club of Chicago (January 1, 1976), hardcover
Meschter, Daniel Y., Pre-Territorial Colorado Postal History, La Posta Publications (1994), 91 pages
Segerstrom, Kenneth Colorado Illustrated Covers La Posta Publications (1988), paperback, 100 pages

Postal history
Philatelic terminology
Philately of the United States
Postal history of the United States